State Route 229 (SR 229) is a state highway located entirely within the town of Limestone in extreme northeastern Maine. SR 229 is also known as Grand Falls Road.

Route description
SR 229 begins at US 1A (Main Street) in downtown Limestone and heads eastward as Grand Falls Road. The highway crosses over a railroad track and leaves downtown Limestone, passing to the south of Limestone Pond. The route passes several residences and periods of large farms and grasslands surrounding the two-lane highway.  Just before the intersection with Morris Road, SR 229 makes a short turn further northeast and intersects with Blake Road and Nike Road. Just after the intersection with Nike Road, SR 229 passes one farm and reaches the Gillespie Portage Border Crossing. At the Canadian border, SR 229 ends and the road continues eastward in New Brunswick as Route 375 towards Grand Falls.

The border crossing is open from 6:00 AM–10:00 PM EST, 7 days a week, year round.

Junction list

References

External links

Floodgap Roadgap's RoadsAroundME: Maine State Route 229

229
Transportation in Aroostook County, Maine